Charlene Zettel (née Gonzales) born May 26, 1947, served in the California State Assembly from 1999 until 2002. Ms. Zettel was born in East Los Angeles, California. She attended Flintridge Sacred Heart Academy in La Canada-Flintridge and then earned her bachelor's degree in dental hygiene from University of Southern California.  While serving in the State Assembly, Zettel worked for the passage of "Oliver's Law", which provides parents with information about day care providers. She was also the first Republican Latina elected to the State Assembly. She stepped down with one term to go before term limits would have claimed her in order to run for the California State Senate,  but lost that election to Dennis Hollingsworth, who claimed 54% of the vote while Zettel claimed 46%.  She was appointed the Director of the Department of Consumer Affairs in March 2004 by Governor Arnold Schwarzenegger.

Charlene Zettel was appointed University of California Regent by Governor Arnold Schwarzenegger in 2009. Regent Zettel will serve a 12-year term that expires March 1, 2021. She is also a board member of the San Diego Regional Airport Authority and a former public interest director of the Federal Home Loan Bank of San Francisco. Also in 2009, she was appointed director for the San Diego Office of the Governor. Ms Zettel has been married to David for 40 years; the couple has two adult sons.

References

Politicians from Los Angeles
University of Southern California alumni
Republican Party members of the California State Assembly
Women state legislators in California
Hispanic and Latino American women in politics
Living people
21st-century American politicians
21st-century American women politicians
1947 births